Peter A. MacIsaac (February 10, 1878 – January 9, 1969) was a dairy farmer and political figure on Prince Edward Island. He represented 1st Kings in the Legislative Assembly of Prince Edward Island from 1935 to 1943 as a Liberal.

He was born in Souris, Prince Edward Island, the son of Donald A. MacIsaac and Annie Ford. MacIsaac was a lieutenant in a Canadian artillery unit from 1898 to 1902. In 1910, he married Mary Josephine McInnis. He was an unsuccessful candidate for a seat in the provincial assembly in 1931 and was defeated when he ran for reelection in 1943. MacIsaac died in the Souris Hospital at the age of 80.

References
 

Prince Edward Island Liberal Party MLAs
1878 births
1969 deaths
People from Souris, Prince Edward Island